A virtual power plant (VPP) is a cloud-based distributed power plant that aggregates the capacities of heterogeneous distributed energy resources (DER) for the purposes of enhancing power generation, trading or selling power on the electricity market, and demand side options for load reduction. 

DER assets in a VPP can include photovoltaic solar, energy storage, electric vehicle chargers, and demand-responsive devices (such as water heaters, thermostats, and appliances) with examples of virtual power plants existing in the United States, Europe, and Australia.

Power generation
A virtual power plant is a system that integrates several types of power sources to give a reliable overall power supply. The sources often form a cluster of different types of dispatchable and non-dispatchable, controllable or flexible load (CL or FL) distributed generation (DG) systems that are controlled by a central authority and can include microCHPs, natural gas-fired reciprocating engines, small-scale wind power plants (WPP), photovoltaics (PV), run-of-river hydroelectricity plants, small hydro, biomass, backup generators, and energy storage systems (ESS).

This system has benefits such as the ability to deliver peak load electricity or load-following power generation on short notice. Such a VPP can replace a conventional power plant while providing higher efficiency and more flexibility, which allows the system to react better to load fluctuations. The drawback is a higher complexity of the system, which requires complicated optimization, control, and secure communications. An interactive simulation on the website of the VPP operator Next Kraftwerke illustrates how the technology works.

According to a 2012 report by Pike Research, VPP capacity would, from 2011 to 2017, increase by 65%, from 55.6 gigawatts (GW) to 91.7 GW worldwide, generating from $5.3 billion to $6.5 billion in worldwide revenue in 2017. In a more aggressive forecast scenario, the clean-tech market intelligence firm forecasts that global VPP revenues could reach as high as $12.7 billion during the same period.

"Virtual power plants represent an 'Internet of Energy, said senior analyst Peter Asmus of Pike Research. "These systems tap existing grid networks to tailor electricity supply and demand services for a customer. VPPs maximize value for both the end user and the distribution utility using a sophisticated set of software-based systems. They are dynamic, deliver value in real time, and can react quickly to changing customer load conditions."

Ancillary services

Virtual power plants can also be used to provide ancillary services to grid operators in order to help maintain grid stability. Ancillary services include frequency regulation, load following, and providing operating reserve. These services are primarily used to maintain the instantaneous balance of electrical supply and demand. Power plants providing ancillary services must respond to signals from grid operators to increase or decrease load on the order of seconds to minutes in response to varying levels of consumer demand.

Since ancillary services are typically provided by controllable fossil-fuel generators, future carbon-free electrical grids that contain high percentages of solar and wind must rely on other forms of controllable power generation or consumption. One of the most well-known examples of this is Vehicle to Grid technology. In this case, distributed electrical vehicles connected to the grid can be controlled together to act as a single virtual power plant. By selectively controlling the rate at which each individual vehicle charges, the grid sees a net injection or consumption of energy as if a large scale battery was providing this service.

Similarly, flexible demand in the form of heat pumps or air conditioners has also been explored to provide ancillary services to the grid. As long as indoor thermal comfort is maintained, an aggregation of distributed heat pumps can be selectively turned off and on in order to vary their aggregate power consumption and follow an ancillary service signal. Again, the effect on the grid is the same as if a large scale power plant was providing the service.

Since they operate in parallel, virtual power plants can have the advantage of higher ramp rates than thermal generators, which is especially important in grids that experience a duck curve and have high ramping requirements in the morning and evening. However, the distributed nature generates communication and latency issues, which could be problematic for providing fast services like frequency regulation.

Energy trading
A virtual power plant is also a cloud-based central or distributed control center that takes advantage of information and communication technologies (ICTs) and Internet of things (IoT) devices to aggregate the capacities of heterogeneous Distributed Energy Resources (DERs) to form "a coalition of heterogeneous DERs" for the purpose of energy trading on the wholesale electricity markets or providing ancillary services for system operators on behalf of non-eligible individual DERs.

A VPP acts as an intermediary between DERs and the wholesale electricity market and trades energy on behalf of DER owners who by themselves are unable to participate in that market. The VPP behaves as a conventional dispatchable power plant from the point of view of other market participants, although it is indeed a cluster of many diverse DERs. Also, in the competitive electricity markets, a virtual power plant acts as an arbitrageur between diverse energy trading floors (i.e., bilateral and PPA contracts, forward and futures markets, and the pool).

So far, for risk management purposes, five different risk-hedging strategies (i.e., IGDT, RO, CVaR, FSD, and SSD) have been applied to the decision-making problems of VPPs in the research articles to measure the level of conservatism of VPPs' decisions in diverse energy trading floors (e.g., day-ahead electricity market, derivatives exchange market, and bilateral contracts):

 IGDT : Information Gap Decision Theory
 RO   : Robust optimization
 CVaR : Conditional Value at Risk
 FSD  : First-order Stochastic Dominance
 SSD  : Second-order Stochastic Dominance

United States

Energy markets are those commodity markets that deal specifically with the trade and supply of energy. In the United States, virtual power plants not only deal with the supply side, but also help manage demand, and ensure reliability of grid functions through demand response (DR) and other load-shifting approaches, in real time.

An often-reported energy crisis in America has opened the door for government-subsidized companies to enter an arena that has only been available to utilities and multinational billion-dollar companies until now. With the deregulation of markets around the United States, the wholesale market pricing became the exclusive domain of large retail suppliers; however local and federal legislation along with large end-users are beginning to recognize the advantages of wholesale activities.

Texas is in the stage of developing pilot VPP projects to evaluate the impact on service and reliability.  They have had several meetings of their ADER (Aggregated Distributed Energy Resources) task force to develop the criteria for pilot projects to operate.  

In California there are two electrical markets: private retail and wholesale. California Senate Bill 2X—which passed the California legislature on March 30, 2011—mandates 33% renewables by 2020 without mandating any particular method to reach that goal. PG&E pays VPP providers $2/kWh during peak times.

As of August/September 2022, SunRun VPP inputs 80 MW at peak times, and Tesla VPP inputs 68 MW.

Europe
The Institute for Solar Energy Supply Technology of the University of Kassel in Germany pilot-tested a combined power plant that linked solar, wind, biogas, and pumped-storage hydroelectricity to provide load-following power around the clock, completely from renewable sources.
Virtual power station operators are also commonly referred to as aggregators.

To test the effects of micro combined heat and power on a smart grid, 45 natural gas SOFC units (each generating 1.5kW) from Republiq Power (Ceramic Fuel Cells) will be placed in 2013 on Ameland to function as a virtual power plant.

An example of a real-world virtual power plant can be found on the Scottish Inner Hebrides island of Eigg.

Next Kraftwerke from Cologne, Germany operates a virtual power plant in seven European countries providing peak-load operation, power trading and grid balancing services. The company aggregates distributed energy resources from biogas, solar and wind as well as large-scale power consumers.

Distribution network operator, UK Power Networks, and Powervault, a battery manufacturer and power aggregator, created London's first virtual power plant in 2018, installing a trial fleet of battery systems on over 40 homes across the London Borough of Barnet, providing a combined capacity of 0.32 MWh. This scheme was further expanded through a second contract in St Helier, London in 2020. 

In September 2019, SMS plc entered the virtual power plant sector in the United Kingdom following the acquisition of Irish energy tech start-up, Solo Energy. 

In October 2020, Tesla launched its Tesla Energy Plan in the UK in partnership with Octopus Energy, allowing households to join its UK Tesla Virtual Power Plant. Homes under the scheme are powered with 100% renewable energy from either solar panels on the roof or from Octopus Energy.

Australia
Commencing in August 2020, Tesla will install a 5 kW rooftop solar system and 13.5 kWh Powerwall battery at each Housing SA premises, at no upfront cost to the tenant. As South Australia's largest virtual power plant, the battery and solar systems can be centrally managed, collectively delivering 20 MW of generation capacity and 54 MWh of energy storage.

In August 2016, AGL Energy announced a 5MW virtual-power-plant scheme for Adelaide, Australia. The company will supply battery and photovoltaic systems from Sunverge Energy, of San Francisco, to 1000 households and businesses.  The systems will cost consumers AUD $3500 and are expected to recoup the expense in savings in 7years under current distribution network tariffs. The scheme is worth AUD $20million and is being billed as the largest in the world.

See also

 Automatic meter reading
 Distributed generation
 Electricity meter
 Energy demand management
 Engine power plant
 Feed-in tariff
 Grid energy storage
 Micro-CHP
 Net metering
 Peaking power plant
 Power system automation
 Power-to-X
 Smart meter
 Smart grid
 Utility submeter
 Vehicle-to-grid

References

External links
AGL Virtual Power Plant VPP project

Distributed generation